Alexander King Farrar (1814–1878) was a state senator, lawyer, plantation owner, and secession convention delegate in Mississippi.

Farrar was a prominent slave owner with a large plantation near Kingston, Mississippi. He owned about 250 slaves. He represented Adams County, Mississippi in the Mississippi Senate from 1852 to 1858. He married Ann Mary Dougharty and, after her death in the 1860s, Lue Philps Lesley.  He was involved in investigating the murder of a plantation manager.

Farrar was involved in the hanging of dozens of enslaved people during the American Civil War. After the war he was involved in a plan to sell part of his plantation to freedmen.

Louisiana State University has a collection of his papers.

References

People from Adams County, Mississippi
Mississippi state senators
19th-century American politicians
Mississippi lawyers
American slave owners

1814 births
1878 deaths